Genettinae is a subfamily of the feliform viverrids. It contains all of the genet species (genus Genetta) and the oyan species (genus Poiana).

Classification

Living species

Phylogeny
The phylogenetic relationships of Genettinae are shown in the following cladogram:

References

Viverrids
Mammal subfamilies